Emma Taylor may refer to:

 Emma Ahuena Taylor (1867–1937), Hawaiian historian and genealogist
 Emma Taylor-Isherwood (born 1987), Canadian actress
 Emma Taylor (engineer), British safety engineer
 Emma Taylor (Coronation Street), fictional character
 Emma Taylor (rugby union) (born 1992), Canadian rugby union player